Roger Preece (born 9 June 1968) was an English professional footballer who mainly played as a midfielder but could also play as a full back. He played in The Football League for three clubs and has also played and managed in non–league football.

Playing and coaching career
Preece began his playing career as an apprentice with Coventry City, but in August 1986 he moved to Wrexham. He made more than 100 Football League appearances over the next four years gaining a Welsh Cup runners-up medal against Cardiff City at Swansea's Vetch in 1988 and helping the Robins to the 1988/89 play off final against Leyton Orient. However, he had a poor disciplinary record, being sent off five times. In summer 1990, he was released by Wrexham and moved to local rivals Chester City, which was a division higher in the Football League Third Division. He began at Chester as a full back but went on to make his greatest mark as a midfielder.

He helped Chester win promotion from Division Three in 1993–94, scoring in the promotion decider against Hereford United on 23 April 1994. He was named player of the season the following year. Unfortunately, Preece played just one more game for the club as a tackle from Hartlepool United's Mick Tait on the opening day of the 1995–96 season ruled him out of action for the remainder of the season. He left the club in October 1996 after failing to recover, spending the remainder of the season with GM Vauxhall Conference sides Southport and Telford United.

In June 1997, Preece returned to The Football League as player–coach with Shrewsbury Town. In 2000, he teamed up again with manager Jake King at Telford United, where they worked together until Preece became Newtown manager in June 2003. He remained in charge until October 2006, leaving after a 6–0 loss to Rhyl.

Preece lately coached with the Wrexham based side Gap Queens Park, as well as with Wrexham's centre of excellence.

After retirement Preece became a Business Development Manager in Sports clothing working for local and international brands. He also continues to play 5 a side football in Shrewsbury.

Honours
Chester City
Football League Division Three runners-up: 1993–94.
Player of the Season: 1994–95

Bibliography

References

External links

Chester City 'What Happened To…?' article (2002)
Welsh Premier career statistics

1969 births
Living people
People from Much Wenlock
English footballers
Association football midfielders
Association football fullbacks
English Football League players
National League (English football) players
Cymru Premier players
Cymru Premier managers
English football managers
Coventry City F.C. players
Wrexham A.F.C. players
Chester City F.C. players
Shrewsbury Town F.C. players
Southport F.C. players
Telford United F.C. players
Newtown A.F.C. players
Newtown A.F.C. managers